Lisa M. Boscola (born April 6, 1962) is an American politician from Pennsylvania currently serving as a Democratic member of the Pennsylvania State Senate, representing the 18th Senate District which includes portions of Lehigh and Northampton.

Boscola was born in Bethlehem, Pennsylvania to Richard and Anna Stofko.  She is a graduate of Bethlehem's Freedom High School and Villanova University, from which she holds both a bachelor's degree and a master's degree in political science.

After college, she worked briefly as a court clerk before entering politics. From 1987 to 1993, Boscola was a Northampton County deputy court administrator. She first won a seat in the Pennsylvania House of Representatives in 1994 and served two terms. In 1998, she won a seat in the state senate and was re-elected in 2002, 2006, 2010, 2014, 2018, and 2022.

Committee assignments 

 Banking & Insurance Committee
 Consumer Protection & Professional Licensure Committee
 Minority Chair
 Community, Economic & Recreational Development Committee
Environmental Resources and Energy
 Urban Affairs and Housing

References

External links

State Senator Lisa M. Boscola official website
Pennsylvania State Senate - Lisa M. Boscola official PA Senate website
Project Vote Smart - Senator Lisa M. Boscola (PA) profile
Follow the Money - Lisa Boscola
2006 2004 2002 2000 1998 campaign contributions
 Delta Delta Delta Distinguished Alumnae profile

1962 births
20th-century American women politicians
21st-century American women politicians
Freedom High School (Pennsylvania) alumni
Living people
Democratic Party members of the Pennsylvania House of Representatives
Democratic Party Pennsylvania state senators
Villanova University alumni
Women state legislators in Pennsylvania

Politicians from Bethlehem, Pennsylvania